The Deep is a 1977 adventure film based on Peter Benchley's 1976 novel of the same name. It was directed by Peter Yates, and stars Robert Shaw, Jacqueline Bisset and Nick Nolte.

Plot
While scuba-diving near shipwrecks off Bermuda, vacationing couple David Sanders and Gail Berke recover a number of artifacts, including an ampoule of amber-coloured liquid and a medallion bearing the image of a woman and the letters "S.C.O.P.N." (meaning "Santa Clara, ora pro nobis", for "Saint Clara, pray for us") and a date, 1714. Gail is attacked while probing a crevice in the wreck, and in panic escapes by getting loose from her wooden baton, which is shown to have its end shredded. Sanders and Berke seek the advice of lighthouse-keeper and treasure-hunter Romer Treece on the origin of the medallion; he identifies the item as Spanish and takes an interest in the young couple. The ampoule is noticed by the man who had rented diving equipment to Sanders and Berke, which in turn attracts the attention of Henri "Cloche" Bondurant, a local drug kingpin for whom the shop owner works, who unsuccessfully tries to buy the ampoule and then begins to terrorise the couple with black magic. The ampoule contains medicinal morphine from the Goliath, a ship that sank during World War II with a cargo of munitions and medical supplies. The wreck of the Goliath is considered dangerous and is posted as off-limits to divers due to the danger of explosions. Treece concludes that a recent storm has exposed her cargo of morphine and unearthed a much older wreck containing Spanish treasure.

Treece makes a deal with Cloche, so they can dive in peace and making him believe he will get the ampoules for a million dollars, while his real plan is to have the chance to find the treasure. Cloche gives him three days to recover them. Sanders, Berke and Treece make several dives to the wrecks, recovering thousands of morphine ampoules from Goliath and several additional artifacts from the Spanish wreck. They also encounter a huge moray eel, which lurks inside the vessel, and was obviously the source of the attack on Gail earlier. Adam Coffin, the only survivor from Goliath, joins to help in the boat, but his loyalty is not very clear. When they are attacked by sharks, Coffin only says that he probably fell asleep without noticing they were in trouble.

Through research in Treece's library, they reconstruct the history of the lost treasure ship, locate a list of valuable items, including a gold pinecone filled with pearls, with the letters "EF" engraved on it, and learn that it identifies Elisabeth Farnese, a noblewoman for whom they were made by the King of Spain. Sanders is determined to locate at least one item on the list to establish provenance, since without it there is no real value to the treasure. Treece wishes to destroy the Goliath to put the morphine out of reach of Cloche, and Cloche interferes with their efforts so that he can recover the morphine for himself. During a running series of conflicts, Treece's friend Kevin is murdered by one of Cloche's henchmen. Adam betrays them and is killed when he triggers a booby-trap while trying to steal the recovered morphine. A climactic battle during the final dive ensues, with Cloche (who is killed by the giant eel) and his divers being killed in the destruction of the Goliath and the recovery of a gold dragon necklace that will provide the needed provenance of the treasure.

Cast

Two actors from the Jaws films (which were also based on a novel by Peter Benchley) appeared in this film. Robert Shaw played shark hunter "Quint" in Jaws in 1975, while Louis Gossett Jr. would later go on to play SeaWorld park owner "Calvin Bouchard" in Jaws 3 in 1983. Shaw's character Romer Treece was largely inspired by Bermudian explorer Teddy Tucker who makes a cameo appearance as the Harbor Master early in The Deep. Tucker's own dive boat The Brigadier was dressed to play Treece's boat Corsair and it was on that vessel that Peter Benchley partly wrote Jaws.

Production
The original concept was developed from the story of a Bermuda shipwreck, the Constellation, which sank in 1942, carrying ampoules of morphine among other war cargoes, such as concrete and pharmaceuticals. Constellation sank after possibly striking the wreckage of American Civil War blockade runner Montana, which Peter Benchley described as having sunk one on top of the other.

After the success of Jaws, Columbia Pictures purchased the rights to Benchley's next novel before its publication in 1976, hiring him to write a screen adaptation. After Peter Guber left his job at Columbia and signed a three-year distribution deal between Columbia and his new company Casablanca FilmWorks, he received The Deep as his company's first project. Benchley's screenplay was rewritten by Tracy Keenan Wynn and Tom Mankiewicz, while Robert Shaw and Nick Nolte rewrote much of their dialogue.

Filming began in July 1976 with open water diving sequences off Black Rock Point, Salt Island, near Peter Island, the location of the real shipwreck of the RMS Rhone in the British Virgin Islands. By August 1976 the production was filming land sequences on location in Bermuda. Other scenes were filmed at the Great Barrier Reef in Australia. Robert Shaw was paid $650,000 plus a percentage of the profits; Bissett and Nolte were paid $200,000 each. After Shaw suggested that the film would be more realistic if the filming took place underwater, the entire cast and crew were taught how to scuba dive and filmed their scenes underwater. Although some scenes were shot in the real Caribbean Sea at depths of 80 feet, many of them would ultimately be filmed in underwater sets to eliminate the need for decompression. The film originally had an alternate opening depicting the sinking of the Goliath in 1943 with a cameo appearance by Benchley, but it was cut from the film. 

The production was responsible for a number of technical firsts, including Al Giddings' Petermar camera system and the use of specially modified 5000-watt "Senior" luminaires to provide cinematic lighting underwater. The world's biggest underwater set was dug at the summit of a historic Bermuda hill formerly known as Hospital Island at Ireland Island South.

The film was marketed with a massive advertising campaign, with Columbia spending $1.3 million in television commercials and $1.5 million in print advertising. The film was marketed in Playboy and Penthouse magazine with a still of Bisset in a wet T-shirt, although plans to make a poster of this image were cancelled after Bisset threatened to sue. After the ABC Television Network released The Making of Star Wars, Columbia produced a similar one-hour special called The Making of The Deep on the CBS Television Network. Research data reported in The New York Times showed that the marketing of the film was so extensive that the average moviegoer viewing the film had already seen a full 15 minutes of it.

Music
The film's score was composed by John Barry, who at the time was most famous for his work on the James Bond film series. In the same manner of a Bond film, Barry collaborated with a high profiled singer for the film's theme song. American singer Donna Summer teamed up with Barry for the film's signature song, titled "Down Deep Inside (Theme From The Deep)". Summer was a singer under contract to the film production company, Casablanca Record & FilmWorks. The song was nominated for a Golden Globe Award and a hit on the U.S. Dance Chart, as well as a top-five singles hit in the UK, and a top-forty hit in the Netherlands.

Charts

Reception
The Deep was released on June 17, 1977, and was well received by the public. For the first time in film history the audience saw the real underwater world filmed in Panavision. The film reportedly cost $8.5 million to market having assured promotional partners that by opening day over 200 million people would have read, seen or heard about The Deep more than 15 times. Upon its release, the film was noted for its opening scene of Jacqueline Bisset swimming underwater while wearing only a thin, white T-shirt and a black bikini bottom. A possibly opportunistic photo of Bisset in character taken underwater by the wreck of RMS Rhone was used to target the men's lifestyle market without her approval. Producer Peter Guber claimed this helped make the film a box office success, and said "That T-shirt made me a rich man!"

Variety reported that The Deep opened to $8,124,316 on 800 screens beating the opening weekend record set by Jaws, although it had opened on almost double the number of screens that Jaws had. It was the eighth-highest-grossing film of 1977 in the United States and Canada with a gross of $47.3 million. Overseas, the film was Columbia's highest-grossing film and grossed over $100 million worldwide, although Guber complained in May 1978 that he had not received any profit participation.

Vincent Canby of The New York Times gave the film a negative review, stating that "The story, as well as Peter Yates's direction of it, is juvenile without being in any attractive way innocent, but the underwater sequences are nice enough, alternately beautiful and chilling. The shore-based melodrama is as badly staged as any I've seen since Don Schain's The Abductors (1972), which is to remember incompetence of stunning degree."
Roger Ebert praised the film for its photography and presenting a romance in a new setting.

The Deep holds a 43% rating on Rotten Tomatoes based on 23 reviews.

Awards and nominations
The film was nominated for one Academy Award and one Golden Globe Award:

Comic book adaptation
 Marvel Comics: The Deep (November 1977)

References

External links
 
 
 
 
 
 The Deep filming locations

1977 films
American adventure films
1970s English-language films
1970s adventure films
1970s American films
Films based on American thriller novels
Films directed by Peter Yates
Films set in Bermuda
Treasure hunt films
Underwater action films
Films scored by John Barry (composer)
Columbia Pictures films
Films about vacationing
Films adapted into comics
Films produced by Peter Guber
Films based on works by Peter Benchley
EMI Films films
Films shot in the Caribbean
Films shot in Bermuda
Films shot in Queensland